Richard J. Snyder Jr. (born February 1, 1944) is an American former professional basketball player. He played in the National Basketball Association (NBA) for the St. Louis Hawks, Phoenix Suns, Seattle SuperSonics, and Cleveland Cavaliers.  Snyder graduated from Davidson College and was drafted by the Hawks in the second round of the 1966 NBA draft. A solid shooting guard, Snyder achieved his greatest basketball successes with the SuperSonics franchise.

During the early 1970s, Snyder was often among the league leaders in field goal percentage.  Perhaps his best season statistically was the 1970–71 season when he averaged 19.4 points per game and was fifth in the league in both field goal and free throw percentage. Traded to Cleveland after the 1974 season, Snyder returned to the SuperSonics in his final season in 1978–79 where he earned an NBA championship ring.

Snyder was a star football, baseball, and basketball player in high school and also pitched and played outfield for Davidson's baseball team. In 2011, he was inducted into the Ohio Basketball Hall of Fame.

References

External links
Career statistics
Dick Snyder statistics at NBA.COM
Dick Snyder: Still the Standard in North Canton
Dick Snyder's Ohio Basketball Hall of Fame Induction Speech

1944 births
Living people
All-American college men's basketball players
Basketball players from Ohio
Cleveland Cavaliers players
Davidson Wildcats men's basketball players
People from North Canton, Ohio
Phoenix Suns expansion draft picks
Phoenix Suns players
Seattle SuperSonics players
Shooting guards
Small forwards
St. Louis Hawks draft picks
St. Louis Hawks players
American men's basketball players